is a Japanese singer-songwriter and musician from Yao, Osaka, Japan, who debuted in 2008. On June 1, 2008, Shimizu performed at Central Park in New York City, USA, during the annual Japan Day Festival. Shota Shimizu went to a local Christian school in Osaka where he learned how to sing gospel music. He became captivated with soul music, which is how his music career started. He was inspired by Donny Hathaway, Marvin Gaye, and Ray Charles.

Before his debut, in November 2007, Shimizu sang in English on amateur night at the Apollo Theater in New York City. He was called a "one in a million soul singer" by a local newspaper in New York. The second time he performed at the Apollo Theater was on November 19, 2008. He sang the song "Sukiyaki" by Kyu Sakamoto in Japanese, where he was given a standing ovation from an audience of 1,500 people. He said he sang it because he wanted to show his Japanese pride and demonstrate the beauty of the Japanese language.

Career

Umbrella (2008)
Shimizu's first single, titled "Home", was released on February 20, 2008, and he appeared on Music Station two days after the single's release to promote it. "Home" peaked at ranked at number 5 and sold 27,820 units in its first week. After 17 weeks, it had sold 125,735 copies. His second single, was released on June 4, 2008 in Japan. It ranked at number 4 and sold 22,778 units in its first week. After 12 weeks, it had sold 47,114 copies. Shimizu released his third single "My Treasure" on October 22, 2008. It ranked at number 15 and sold 9,540 units in its first week. After 5 weeks, it had sold 15,365 copies.

He released his debut album titled Umbrella, on November 26, 2008 in Japan. The album ranked at number 2 and sold 56,442 units in its first week. After 8 weeks, it has sold 115,863 copies. In March 2009, Shimizu began his first headlining tour, the "Umbrella Tour 2009". The tickets sold out in one day.

After Umbrella (2009)
Shimizu released his fourth single titled "Utsukushii Hibi yo" / "Sayonara wa Itsumo Sobani" on July 15, 2009 in Japan. It debuted at number 14 and sold 8,576 copies in the first week. The track "Kaze no Youni" from this single was inspired by the song "Kaze no Dōkei" from the Chrono Trigger Soundtrack. The single sold a total of 11,144 copies so far.

Collaborations
Shimizu worked with Dohzi-T on the single "One Love", which was released on July 18, 2007. He also collaborated with Miliyah Kato on the song "I'm Your Angel" on the album Tribute to Celine Dion, which was released on September 26, 2007. Shimizu collaborated with Miliyah Kato again in 2009 on her "Love Forever" single (which was also released onto Miliyah Kato's album, Ring), which was released on May 13, 2009. "Love Forever" was a hit in Japan, and its ringtone sold over two million downloads. These Japanese singers/songwriters were both twenty years old and loved soul music, but still maintained very different music styles. On September 16, 2009, M-flo released a tribute album named Tribute: Maison de M-Flo and Shimizu covered the song "Let Go". He then released a song, "Loving You", in a compilation album named Beat Connection with Crystal Kay, Seamo, Mummy-D, and Dohzi-T on October 27, 2010.

Discography

Singles

Albums

Studio albums

Cover albums

Best albums

Collaborations

Singles

Participation in Albums

Other appearances

References

External links

  
 Shota Shimizu Sony Music Online Japan official website 

Sony Music Entertainment Japan artists
1989 births
Living people
Japanese male singer-songwriters
Japanese singer-songwriters
People from Yao, Osaka
Japanese male pop singers
21st-century Japanese singers
21st-century Japanese male singers